Myślino  is a village in the administrative district of Gmina Gościno, within Kołobrzeg County, West Pomeranian Voivodeship, in north-western Poland. 

The village has a population of 142.

References

Villages in Kołobrzeg County